Pudipeddi Jogeswara Sarma was an Indian film dubbing artist, turned actor and writer, known for his works predominantly in Telugu cinema. He has worked for over 500 films as an actor and dubbing artist.
 He is the father of actors Sai Kumar, P. Ravi Shankar and Ayyappa P. Sarma.

He died on 14 December 2014 of a heart attack at the age of 81.

Selected filmography
As actor

1968 Bhale Monagadu
1971 Sampoorna Ramayanam
1972 Bala Bharatam
1972 Collector Janaki
1973 Devudamma as Nagabhushanam
1975 Sri Ramanjaneya Yuddham
1976 Bhale Dongalu as Public Prosecutor
1976 Mahakavi Kshetrayya
1976 Bangaru Manishi
1977 Kurukshetram
1977 Daana Veera Soora Karna
1977 Indradhanusu
1977 Dongalaku Donga as David
1979 Hema Hemeelu
1980 Ram Robert Rahim
1981 Nyayam Kavali
1982 Kaliyuga Ramudu
1982 Talliprema
1983 Shakthi
1983 Khaidi
1984 Tukaram
1985 Erramallelu
1985 Aggiraju
1985 Vijetha
1986 Nireekshana
1986 Ugra Narasimham
1986 Oka Radha Iddaru Krishnulu
1986 Jailu Pakshi
1987 Sankharavam
1988 Kaliyuga Karnudu as Judge
1988 Khaidi No. 786
1988 Rowdy No.1
1990 Karthavyam
1991 Brahmarishi Vishwamitra
1991 Maanagara Kaaval (Tamil)
1994 Mugguru Monagallu
1997 Minsara Kanavu (Tamil)
1998 Tholi Prema
1998 Choodalani Vundi
2001 Athanu
2003 Naaga

Awards

Nandi Awards
Filmfare Awards South

References

Telugu male actors
Indian male voice actors
Male actors in Kannada cinema
Indian male film actors
Filmfare Awards South winners
Nandi Award winners
People from Vizianagaram
20th-century Indian male actors
21st-century Indian male actors
2014 deaths